This list includes notable graduates, non-graduate former students, and current students of Frostburg State University, a four-year state university located in Frostburg, Maryland that is part of the University System of Maryland.

Academia and science

Arts and entertainment

Government, politics, and law

Literature and journalism
 James Wolcott, journalist and cultural critic for Vanity Fair
 Donnie Izzett, missing journalism student from 1995

Military
 James A. Graham, Captain in the Marine Corps and posthumous recipient of the Medal of Honor

Sports

References

Frostburg State University alumni